Hacienda is a Spanish word for an estate or the main house upon the estate, see Hacienda.

Ministerio/Departamento de Hacienda, referring to a government agency in Spain or Latin America, is the treasury department. 

Hacienda, La Hacienda, or The Hacienda may also refer to the following:

Places
in England
 The Haçienda, a nightclub in Manchester, England

in Spain
 Hacienda Na Xamena, a luxury hotel in Ibiza, in the Balearic Islands of Spain

in the United States
(by state then city)
La Hacienda Historic District, Phoenix, Arizona, listed on the NRHP in Arizona
 Hacienda Heights, California, an unincorporated community in Los Angeles County, California
 Hacienda, California, a former town in California
The Hacienda (Milpitas Ranchhouse), a hotel built for William Randolph Hearst, listed on the NRHP in California
 Hacienda Business Park, an industrial development in Pleasanton, California
 Hacienda Arms Apartments, an historic building in West Hollywood, California
La Hacienda (Buffalo Creek, Colorado), listed on the NRHP in Colorado 
 Hacienda Hotel, an historic hotel in New Port Richey, Florida
 Hacienda Village, Fort Wayne, a neighborhood in Fort Wayne, Indiana
 Hacienda Hotel and Casino, hotel outside of Boulder City, Nevada
 Hacienda (resort), a demolished hotel and casino on the Las Vegas Strip, in Nevada

Other

 Hacienda Brothers, American alternative country band
 Hacienda (Mexibús), a BRT station in Zumpango, Mexico
 Hacienda, a 2000s San Antonio rock band
 The Hacienda, a 1988 memoir by Lisa St Aubin de Terán
 Hacienda, a 2005 board game by Wolfgang Kramer
 HACIENDA: Codename for a Five Eyes bulk surveillance program exposed in August 2014.
 Hacienda Free and open source content service for web applications, developed by ThoughtWorks and named after the historic Manchester, UK nightclub.